Fridolina Rolfö (born 24 November 1993) is a Swedish professional footballer who plays as a forward for Spanish Liga F club FC Barcelona and the Sweden women's national team.

Club career
After joining from Tölö, Rolfö scored nine league goals for Jitex in her debut Damallsvenskan season, 2011. Her favoured position was on the right wing, so she could cut inside and shoot with her strong left foot. She was named the 2011 Women's Junior Player of the Year by Göteborgs-Posten,

Rolfö signed for Linköping in 2014 and scored a hat-trick on her UEFA Women's Champions League debut against English champions Liverpool.

In November 2016, it was announced that Rolfö would sign for current Frauen-Bundesliga champions Bayern Munich. She signed an 18-month contract, starting from 1 January 2017. In each of her three seasons in Germany Bayern Munich finished runners up to VfL Wolfsburg in the league.

In May 2019, current Frauen-Bundesliga champions VfL Wolfsburg announced the signing of Rolfö to a two-year contract.

On 25 August 2020, Rolfö scored the only goal against Barcelona in their single-legged Champions League semifinal victory to book a place in the final, where her team eventually lost 1–3 to Lyon.

On June 30, 2021, Rolfö left VfL Wolfsburg after the expiration of her contract. On 7 July 2021, she signed a two-year deal with Barcelona. On 4 September, Rolfö made her official debut for Barcelona when she came on for the last 18 minutes, replacing Mariona Caldentey in her side's 5–0 routing of Granadilla Tenerife. A week later, she scored her first goal for the club, when she slotted her side's fourth goal in another 5–0 victory against Real Betis.

In January 2023, Rolfö extended her contract with Barcelona until June 2026.

International career
Rolfö played for Sweden under-19 international team at the 2011–12 UEFA Women's Under-19 Championship. She helped Sweden win the competition by defeating Spain 1–0 in extra time.

Rolfö's club form with Linköping caught the eye of national team coach Pia Sundhage, who promptly handed Rolfö a debut cap in Sweden's 2–1 friendly defeat by Germany at Eyravallen on 29 October 2014. In her five-minute substitute appearance she almost scored but was denied by German goalkeeper Nadine Angerer.

Rolfö played in the 2016 Summer Olympics at Rio de Janeiro helping Sweden to a silver medal after losing in the final to Germany. Rolfö did not feature in the 2–1 loss in the Gold Medal Match, after suffering a tournament ending injury in the quarter-final against the USWNT.

On 16 June 2019, Rolfö scored her first goal in the 2019 FIFA Women's World Cup in a 5–1 win over Thailand.

Rolfö was selected to represent Sweden in the 2020 Summer Olympics held in Tokyo in 2021. She featured in every match except for Sweden's final group stage match against New Zealand. She scored three goals in five matches as her team won the silver medal again after being defeated 2–3 on penalties by Canada.

Career statistics

Club

International
Scores and results list Sweden's goal tally first, score column indicates score after each Rolfö goal.

Honours
Linköping
Damallsvenskan: 2016
Svenska Cupen: 2013–14, 2014–15

VfL Wolfsburg
Frauen-Bundesliga: 2019–20
DFB-Pokal Frauen: 2019–20, 2020–21
UEFA Women's Champions League: Runner-up: 2019–20

Barcelona
Primera División: 2021–22
Supercopa de España: 2021–22
Copa de la Reina: 2021-2022
UEFA Women's Champions League: Runner-up: 2021–22

Sweden
Summer Olympic Games: Silver Medal, 2016, 2020
FIFA Women's World Cup: Bronze Medal, 2019

Sweden U19
UEFA Women's Under-19 Championship: Winner 2012

Individual
 Fotbollsgalan Diamantbollen: 2021, 2022
 Fotbollsgalan Swedish Forward of the Year: 2021, 2022
 Fotbollsgalan Swedish Goal of the Year: 2021

References

Match reports

External links

 
 Fridolina Rolfö at FC Barcelona
 Fridolina Rolfö at BDFutbol
 
 
 
 

1993 births
Living people
Swedish women's footballers
Swedish expatriate footballers
Jitex BK players
Linköpings FC players
Damallsvenskan players
Footballers at the 2016 Summer Olympics
Sweden women's international footballers
Olympic footballers of Sweden
Medalists at the 2016 Summer Olympics
Olympic silver medalists for Sweden
Olympic medalists in football
People from Kungsbacka
Women's association football forwards
Expatriate women's footballers in Germany
FC Bayern Munich (women) players
VfL Wolfsburg (women) players
FC Barcelona Femení players
Swedish expatriate sportspeople in Germany
Frauen-Bundesliga players
2019 FIFA Women's World Cup players
Footballers at the 2020 Summer Olympics
Medalists at the 2020 Summer Olympics
Sportspeople from Halland County
UEFA Women's Euro 2022 players
UEFA Women's Euro 2017 players